The 1921 Kentucky Wildcats football team represented the University of Kentucky as a member of the Southern Intercollegiate Athletic Association (SIAA) during the 1921 college football season. Led by second-year head coach William Juneau, the Wildcats compiled an overall record of 4–3–1 with a mark of 1–3–1 in SIAA play.

Schedule

References

Kentucky
Kentucky Wildcats football seasons
Kentucky Wildcats football